Vancouver Island University (abbreviated as VIU, formerly known as Malaspina University-College and earlier as Malaspina College) is a Canadian public university serving Vancouver Island and coastal British Columbia. Malaspina College began in 1969 and it has grown into a university which plays an important role in the educational, cultural, and economic life of the region. The main campus is located in Nanaimo; there are regional campuses in Duncan and Powell River as well as a centre in Parksville.

History

Vancouver Island University enrolled its first students in September 1969 as Malaspina College, named after Captain Alessandro Malaspina, who explored Vancouver Island. Registration in the first year was over 600 students, almost double what was initially expected. In 1976, after seven years at the original campus in the old Nanaimo Hospital building at 388 Machleary Street, Malaspina College moved to its new campus on Fifth Street (the present location of VIU) on former Department of National Defense land adjoining the existing Nanaimo Vocational Training School, which had offered trades programs since 1936. In anticipation of construction of a new campus, Malaspina College had merged administration with the existing vocational school in 1971.

Following a 1988 government initiative designed to increase access to degree programs in British Columbia, five community colleges in BC were granted authority to offer baccalaureate degrees, and these five institutions — Malaspina, Fraser Valley, Kwantlen, Cariboo and Okanagan—were renamed university colleges. Initially, they offered degrees through one of the three provincial universities.

Malaspina College had regional campuses in Nanaimo, Duncan, and Powell River by 1990. In the 1990s, several at Malaspina promoted the idea of the institution offering something distinct—interdisciplinary bachelor's degrees in Liberal Studies — and in 1995 the institution was awarded the authority to offer degrees in its own right. In 1995, the province of British Columbia enacted legislation changing the institution's name to Malaspina University-College and allowed it to begin granting academic degrees and college diplomas. Malaspina University-College's Arms and Badge were registered with the Canadian Heraldic Authority on May 20, 1995.

Malaspina University-College was designated a university under an amendment of the University Act and officially began operation as Vancouver Island University on September 1, 2008.

International students: 2,253 in 2017-2018

Vancouver Island University's first president was Dr. Carleton Opgaard. The first chancellor was Chief Shawn A-in-chut Atleo, who in 2009 became the national chief of the Assembly of First Nations. When VIU appointed Chief Atleo as Chancellor he became the first Indigenous person to hold this position in British Columbia.

The university press, The Navigator, established in 1969, is a member of Canadian University Press.
The magazine Portal has been published by VIU students since 1991.

Buildings and facilities

Occupying three campuses and a number of facilities including a centre in Parksville/Qualicum, the Deep Bay Marine Field Station, and Milner Gardens and Woodlands, VIU has had many renovations and major developments in the past few years to accommodate its growing student body and faculty.
 Nanaimo Campus
 Cowichan Campus (Located in Duncan, BC)
 tiwšɛmawtxw (Located in the qathet region)
 Parksville·Qualicum Centre
The main campus located in Nanaimo has  of built space. At this main campus, the most recent facility is the Dr. Ralph Nilson Centre for Health & Science and a new Marine, Automotive and Trades Complex, built with funding from the federal and provincial governments as well as through community support.

Another recently completed project is a district geo-exchange energy system, which uses the energy stored in the water found in the abandoned Wakesiah coal mine underneath the Nanaimo campus to heat and cool some of the university's facilities. This system is the first of its kind in Canada. It leverages the long-abandoned coal mining infrastructure to enable an environmentally responsible heating and cooling solution. This open loop geo-exchange system consumes no groundwater while heating and cooling buildings for only the cost of pumping the water. The electricity to power the pumps comes from hydroelectric sources, leading to a zero emissions heating and cooling solution.

In 2006, a  Faculty of Management Centre opened certified Leadership in Energy and Environmental Design (LEED), and a renovated  library (completed 2005) that offers extensive online and print collections, a special collections reading room, group study rooms, multimedia AV rooms, and computer stations. The VIU Campus Store is also located in the library building.

The Nanaimo campus is home to the Richard W. Johnston Centre for International Education, a gymnasium and fitness facilities; art and music studios; science and computer labs; research centres; a campus career centre; cafeterias; and a student centre on a  campus.

Other notable areas on the Nanaimo campus include Shq'apthut: A Gathering Place, which houses the university's Services for Aboriginal Students; the Kwulasulwut Garden that honours Coast Salish elder and retired VIU Elder-in-Residence Ellen White; two traditional Japanese-style gardens; and the Jardin des quatorze (Garden of the Fourteen), which commemorates the women who died in the 1989 mass shooting at the École Polytechnique in Montreal.

In 2011, VIU opened a new campus in Cowichan which is built to LEED Gold Certification. The campus has a rooftop garden and a geo-exchange system which heats and cools the building

Core programs

Vancouver Island University offers master's and bachelor's degrees; two year diplomas, and one year certificate programs in a range of areas.

Business (M.B.A./M.Sc., post-graduate diploma, Bachelor of Business Administration)
 Education (M.Ed.; B.A.; B.Ed. Post Baccalaureate)
Tourism and Hospitality (M.A.; B.A.)
Science and Technology (B.Sc.)
Social Sciences (B.Sc.; B.A)
Including a Master of Community Planning (M.C.P.), a Master of Geographic Information Systems Applications (M.G.I.S.A.), and an Advanced Diploma in Geographic Information Systems Applications (A.D.G.I.S.A.)
Art and Design, and Performing Arts (B.A.)
Humanities (M.A.; B.A.)
With 17 majors and minors including English, Anthropology, Economics, History, Global Studies, Media Studies, and Psychology
Career/Vocational
 Trades and Applied Technology
Health and Human Services Programs including degrees in Social Work, Nursing and Child and Youth Care (B.A.)

In addition, VIU also offers English language certificate programs for English-as-a-second-language (ESL) students.

International programs
Vancouver Island University offers exchange programs that allow students to study for one or two semesters overseas while remaining registered at Vancouver Island University. Current partner institutions are located in Australia, England, Finland, France, Japan, Korea, the Netherlands, New Zealand, Poland, Switzerland and the USA. Vancouver Island University also offers short-term study abroad options in some program areas; destination countries include Belgium, Belize, the Cook Islands, Indonesia, Italy, USA (New York), Tanzania, Korea, France, and Spain. Additionally, Vancouver Island University supports field schools, co-ops, practicum placements and development projects, has sister-school agreements with Japan, Korea and Thailand and educational alliances with schools in Taiwan, China, Mexico, India and Turkey.

Master of Business Administration (MBA) program 

VIU's Faculty of Management offers graduate business programs that appeal to recent graduates and those individuals who require higher education for career advancement or specialized training. When it was initially accredited, VIU School of Business was one of three Canadian business schools that had been internationally accredited by ACBSP; as of May 2020, eight Canadian universities have ACBSP-accredited programmes.

VIU offers a post-graduate program of Master of Business Administration (MBA) and Master of Science in International Management (MSc) jointly with the University of Hertfordshire in the UK. The 2007-08 class enrolled 102 students out of 280 applicants from all over the world, including: Brazil, Canada, China, Egypt, France, Germany, India, Indonesia, Japan, Kuwait, Malaysia, Mexico, Morocco, Nicaragua, Nigeria, Pakistan, Peru, Russia, Taiwan, Trinidad and Tobago, and Turkey.

In 2015, the Vancouver Island University MBA Society hosted the first BC MBA Games. The competition was influenced by the national MBA Games and was attended by VIU earlier in the year. MBA students from across British Columbia competed in a range of intensive activities ranging from sports, case competitions and team spirit events. The event was attended by 110 MBA students from Vancouver Island University, Sauder School of Business, Peter B. Gustavson School of Business, Beedie School of Business and Thompson Rivers University. The event's theme to raise funds for families living with autism generated a total of $10,138 which was donated to the Canucks Autism Network and the Autism Society of British Columbia.
The event ended with Vancouver Island University emerging as the winner of both the BC MBA Games Cup and the Mann Cup.

Students in Vancouver Island University's Master of Business Administration (MBA) program took fourth place in Canada's MBA Games. It was held in Toronto from January 2–4, earning the best result for university MBA programs in western Canada.

VIU's 32 MBA students competing alongside more than 700 students from 20 Canadian universities also took first place in the “Spirit” competition, with the best result in fundraising, video and opening performance. Of the total $69,269 raised by all teams for the designated charity, Ronald McDonald House Charities of Canada, VIU MBA students raised nearly half, $32,000.

Aboriginal involvement
VIU developed governing board and senate policies as well as aboriginal governed councils within the university structure. Aboriginal elders are present on campus at VIU to provide social supports. VIU has developed an Aboriginal Shellfish Aquaculture Training Program to meet specific needs within aboriginal communities. VIU also offers a bachelor's degree in First Nations Studies. The B.A. Major and Minor in First Nations Studies are products of a collaboration between Vancouver Island University and the First Nations of Vancouver Island and Coastal British Columbia. Their purpose is to provide comprehensive, high-quality education respectful of the cultures of Aboriginal peoples, while meeting their diverse needs.  The Child and Youth Care Diploma Program based at the Cowichan Campus (Duncan) works with Elders and Firsts Nations leaders from the Coast Salish tradition to prepare graduates to work with children, youth, families and communities in a manner that is described as bi-cultural.  The Child and Youth Care Degree program offers an Aboriginal child welfare focus which explores and supports both Aboriginal and non Aboriginal students to work with Aboriginal families and communities.

Symbols and coat of arms

Partnership
 University of Hertfordshire, UK
 California State University, East Bay, US
 University of Montana, US
 University of Central Arkansas, US
 University of Canberra, AU
 Deakin University, AU
 Victoria University, AU
 UNITEC, NZ
 Mejiro University, JP

Notable alumni
Gwen O'Mahony - Former MLA in the 39th Parliament of British Columbia
Victor Blasco - Professional soccer player

See also
Education in Canada
Higher education in British Columbia
Higher education in Canada
List of institutes and colleges in British Columbia
List of universities in British Columbia

References

External links

BC Government announcement
The Navigator Newspaper
Malaspina High School
Vancouver Island University Library
VIU Wikipedia Community of Practice
VIUSpace Institutional Repository

 
1969 establishments in British Columbia
Educational institutions established in 1969
Universities in British Columbia